Ruga may refer to:

Ruga (anatomy), an anatomical fold
Ruga, Nepal
Ruga language, an extinct Sino-Tibetan language that was spoken in Meghalaya, India
Ruga-Ruga, irregular troops in Eastern Africa, often deployed by western colonial forces
Rugila, 5th-century Hunnic ruler
Spurius Carvilius Ruga, 3rd-century Roman grammarian who invented the letter g